Enlisted is an American sitcom that premiered January 10, 2014, on Fox. Fox placed a 13-episode order for the single-camera comedy in May 2013. Despite low ratings, the show received many good reviews.

On March 26, 2014, Fox announced that from April 11, Kitchen Nightmares would be airing in Enlisteds timeslot – effectively removing Enlisted from the schedule after nine episodes had aired. On May 7, 2014, Fox canceled the series due to low ratings, but allowed the final four episodes to air in June. The entire first season was released on DVD on December 9, 2014.

Premise
Three very different brothers, each soldiers in the U.S. Army, find themselves all assigned to the same unit: the fictional A Company, 2nd Battalion, 618th Infantry Regiment, 1st Brigade Combat Team, 18th Infantry Division (Mechanized), at the fictional Fort McGee, located in Florida. While the majority of the base's personnel are deployed overseas, the two younger brothers (Derrick and Randy) are assigned to rear detachmentthe soldiers left behind to take care of the base. The oldest brother, Staff Sergeant Pete Hill, is returned stateside from Afghanistan after punching a superior officer. He is assigned to supervise a platoon of misfits that includes his brothers. While working together, the brothers are able to renew and strengthen their childhood bonds.

Cast

Main cast
 Geoff Stults as Staff Sergeant Peter "Pete" Hill
 Chris Lowell as Corporal Derrick Hill
 Parker Young as Private First Class Randall "Randy" Hill
 Keith David as Command Sergeant Major Donald Cody
 Angelique Cabral as Staff Sergeant Jillian "Jill" Perez

Supporting cast
 Kyle Davis as Private First Class Dobkiss
 Tania Gunadi as Private First Class Cindy Park
 Mel Rodriguez as Specialist George Chubowski
Mort Burke as Private First Class Mort Gumble
 Michelle Buteau as Private Tanisha Robinson
Maronzio Vance as Private Ruiz
Ross Philips as Second Lieutenant Tyson Schneeberger
 Jessy Hodges as Erin
Rob Lamer as Sam
 Brandon Routh as Brandon Stone

Episodes
The first season aired mostly out of the production order in an effort to build early positive buzz by airing "stronger" episodes first. As a result, some plot points did not play out as intended by the creative teammost noticeably in the fourth episode to air ("Homecoming"), which was the tenth episode produced; there was a jump forward as Derrick was shown to be in a relationship with Erin despite not meeting her until the sixth episode to air, which was the fifth episode produced. This resulted in a "lack of investment in the stakes of said relationship". The football-themed tenth episode had been moved forward to coincide with Super Bowl XLVIII, which took place two days later. According to producer Mike Royce, the following is the correct order.

U.S. ratings

Scheduling and cancellation
Fox pulled Enlisted from its schedule after the ninth aired episode on March 28, 2014. The network stated it would air the remaining four episodes at some point, later announcing June 1, 2014 as the restart date. Ratings had been poor, though many fans and television critics cited a poor time slot and episodes airing out of sequence for the show's failure. The program was officially cancelled on May 7, 2014, despite pleas from fans and some TV writers to keep it on the air. The Army Times wrote an editorial asking Fox to give the show another chance in a better time slot.
The final four episodes were made available on Hulu.

Broadcast
The series premiered in Australia on Eleven on May 18, 2014.

References

External links

2010s American single-camera sitcoms
2010s American workplace comedy television series
2014 American television series debuts
2014 American television series endings
English-language television shows
Fox Broadcasting Company original programming
Military comedy television series
Television series by 20th Century Fox Television
Television shows set in Florida
Television series about brothers